Stacey Nesbitt (born March 10, 1997 in Antrim, Northern Ireland) is a Canadian motorcycle road racer. She won her first Canadian National Road Racing Championship aged 14 that was open to men and women. Nesbitt is the first woman and Canadian to compete in the Asia Dream Cup. She currently races in the European Junior Cup aboard a Honda CBR650F.

Career 
Nesbitt competed in her first race at the end of 2009 having no prior motorcycling experience. In 2011, she won her first national championship, the Canadian Superbike Championship (CSBK) Honda CBR125R National Challenge, winning five of the ten races. She also won the RACE Superseries Honda CBR125R Cup regional championship.

Nesbitt won her second national championship in 2012, the Canadian Superbike Championship (CSBK) inaugural Honda CBR250R National Challenge, winning two races and finishing on the podium in all rounds. She was invited to compete as a wild card entry in the final round of the 2012 Asia Dream Cup, an FIM Asia Road Racing Championship class, held under the floodlights of the Losail International Circuit, Qatar. Nesbitt was selected for the Red Bull Rookies Cup tryouts in 2013 and 2014.

Nesbitt was runner up in the 2014 Canadian Superbike Championship (CSBK) AM Sportbike class and third in AM Superbike. She won the RACE Superseries AM600 and AM Superbike regional championships.

Nesbitt's first Pro race was the final AMA Supersport Championship round at New Jersey Motorsports Park, Millville, New Jersey in the United States in September 2014.

In 2015 Nesbitt was the Canadian Superbike Championship (CSBK) Sunoco/Brooklin Cycle Racing Pro Rookie Of The Year, finishing 8th overall in the Mopar Pro Superbike class. She also finished 6th overall in the Hindle Exhaust Pro Sport Bike class, racing on the Statoni Racing Honda CBR600RR in both categories. Nesbitt is the first female to win Pro Rookie.

Career statistics

Canadian Superbike Championship (CSBK)

European Junior Cup (EJC)

Asia Dream Cup Championship (ADC)

R.A.C.E. Superseries Championship

AMA Pro Road Racing Championship (AMA)

References

External links
Resume at Road Racing World

1997 births
Living people
People from Antrim, County Antrim
People from Montérégie
Female motorcycle racers
Canadian motorcycle racers
Canadian sportswomen